CPRE is a countryside charity in England 

CPRE may also refer to:

 Certified Professional for Requirements Engineering, administered by the International Requirements Engineering Board
 Consortium for Policy Research and Education, founded by Susan Fuhrman
 Certified Park & Recreation Executive, a professional designations in the United States